Brennan Randall Marion (born August 25, 1987) is an American football coach and former American football wide receiver who is currently the offensive coordinator at UNLV. He was signed by the Miami Dolphins as an undrafted free agent in 2009. He played college football at Tulsa and two junior colleges. At Tulsa he set the single season NCAA FBS yards-per-catch record in a single season at 31.9, and finished as the NCAA career leader at 28.7 yards-per-catch. He had back-to-back 1,000-yard receiving seasons. After playing four seasons of college football at three different schools, Marion was eligible to be selected in the 2009 NFL Draft, but went undrafted.

Prep career
Marion was a four-year letter winner in football, basketball and track at Greensburg-Salem High School in Greensburg, Pennsylvania. As a senior, Marion had 23 receptions for 400 yards and four touchdowns. However, his only scholarship offer was a partial scholarship to Temple, and because of low SAT scores, he decided to attend junior college.

Junior college career
Marion began his college career at Foothill College, where he played one season as a tight end and halfback. After 2005, Marion transferred from Foothill to De Anza College in Cupertino, California, where he led all California junior college receivers with 1,196 yards and 16 touchdowns. Switching from a blocking role at Foothill to a primary receiving role at De Anza, Marion earned junior college All-America honors.

Tulsa career
In his first season at Tulsa, Marion led the nation in yards per reception at 31.9, breaking an FBS record in the process. Marion finished the season with 39 receptions for 1,244 yards and 11 touchdowns and was named Conference USA Newcomer of the Year. He was a second-team All-Conference USA selection and was part of just the third-team in FBS history to have three 1,000-yard receivers.

As a senior, Marion played 13 games, finishing with 43 receptions for 1,112 yards and eight touchdowns. He earned first-team All-Conference USA honors, leading the nation in yards per reception for the second consecutive season. However, he suffered a torn left ACL on Tulsa's final offensive play of the Conference USA Championship Game, forcing him to miss the GMAC Bowl and any postseason all-star games.

Marion finished his FBS career averaging 28.7 yards per reception on 83 catches. That broke Wesley Walker's record for average per reception for a player with at least 75 career receptions.

Professional career
Due to his knee injury, Marion attended the 2009 NFL scouting combine but did not participate. He went undrafted in the 2009 NFL Draft, but signed a free agent contract with the Miami Dolphins. During training camp, Marion re-tore his ACL in his left knee. He was placed on injured reserve on August 4, 2009.

Coaching
Marion was the head coach of Saint Patrick Saint Vincent in Vallejo, California in 2013. In his first year he led the Bruins to a first round home playoff loss, just one year after the team finished with a 1–9 record. Marion resigned and moved to Pennsylvania to take another head coaching position at Waynesboro Area Senior High School in 2014. He led the Indians to their first winning season and divisional title in 22 years. His Indians also won 'Team of the Year' as selected by WHAG-TV.

During Marion's tenure at Waynesboro High School, he developed the GoGo offense, which incorporates principles of old-school triple-option offenses with modern spread concepts. In his first game as Howard's offensive coordinator, Marion's offense helped the FCS Bison defeat UNLV on September 13, 2017. The win by the 45-point underdog Bison was the largest point-spread upset in college football history.

Brennan was a quality control coach for Arizona State in 2015 & in 2016 was a running back coach at Oklahoma Baptist University, then served as Howard University's offensive coordinator in 2017 and 2018. In 2019, he followed head coach Mike London from Howard over to the College of William and Mary where he began serving as offensive coordinator.

Marion resigned from his position at William & Mary to serve as the wide receivers coach on Todd Graham's inaugural staff at Hawaii for the 2020 season.

On February 15, 2021, Marion joined the staff at Pittsburgh as the wide receivers coach.

On December 31, 2021, Marion was named passing game coordinator and wide receivers coach at the University of Texas.

See also
 List of NCAA major college football yearly receiving leaders

References

External links
William & Mary Tribe bio
Tulsa Golden Hurricane bio

1987 births
Living people
American football wide receivers
Arizona State Sun Devils football coaches
De Anza Dons football players
Hawaii Rainbow Warriors football coaches
Howard Bison football coaches
Miami Dolphins players
Oklahoma Baptist Bison football coaches
People from Greensburg, Pennsylvania
Pittsburgh Panthers football coaches
Players of American football from Pennsylvania
Texas Longhorns football coaches
Tulsa Golden Hurricane football players
West Valley Vikings football coaches
William & Mary Tribe football coaches